Enga Oor Raja is a 1968 Indian Tamil-language drama film, directed and produced by P. Madhavan. The film stars Sivaji Ganesan, Jayalalithaa, Sowcar Janaki and M. N. Nambiar. It was released on 21 October 1968, and ran for more than 100 days at all centers of Tamil Nadu. The film was remade in Telugu as Dharma Daata (1970).

Plot

Cast 
Sivaji Ganesan as Sedhupathy and Boopathy
Jayalalithaa as Geetha
Sowcar Janaki as Sivakami
M. N. Nambiar as Rajankam
Nagesh as Chakravarthi
Manorama as Rani
Kanakadurga as Vijaya
C. Vasantha as Gowri
Rajapandiyan as Rajankam's brother
Senthamarai as Ramu
Samikannu as Rathnakannu
Master Antony as Young Boopathy
Master Sekhar as Young Chakravarthi
Loose Mohan as Fruit Seller

Soundtrack 
The music was composed by M. S. Viswanathan, with lyrics by Kannadasan.

Release 
Enga Oor Raja was Diwali released on 21 October 1968, and distributed by Vijayasri.

References

External links 
 

1960s Tamil-language films
1968 drama films
1968 films
Films directed by P. Madhavan
Films scored by M. S. Viswanathan
Indian drama films
Tamil films remade in other languages